Avial NV, LLC was an airline based in Moscow, Russia. It operated charter, passenger, and cargo flights. Its main base was Domodedovo International Airport, Moscow. Operations were suspended in 2010 with debts of over 1 million roubles and operations were banned after the expiration of the license in July 2011

Fleet 

The Avial fleet consisted of the following aircraft (at March 2007):

6 Antonov An-12

Previously operated

1 Tupolev Tu-154B-2 (at January 2005)

References

Defunct airlines of Russia
Companies based in Moscow
Defunct cargo airlines
Airlines established in 2000
1991 establishments in the Soviet Union
Airlines disestablished in 2011
Cargo airlines of Russia